Phytoecia is a genus of longhorn beetles of the subfamily Lamiinae,

Species

subgenus Blepisanis
 Phytoecia andreaei Breuning, 1960
 Phytoecia angusta (Aurivillius, 1914)
 Phytoecia anteatra Breuning, 1966
 Phytoecia argenteosuturalis Breuning, 1955
 Phytoecia aterrima Breuning, 1951
 Phytoecia atricollis Breuning, 1954
 Phytoecia aurivilli Breuning, 1951
 Phytoecia basirufipennis Breuning, 1954 
 Phytoecia beuni Breuning, 1976
 Phytoecia bohemani (Pascoe, 1858)
 Phytoecia capensis (Péringuey, 1888)
 Phytoecia cincticollis (Aurivillius, 1925)
 Phytoecia collaris (Pascoe, 1817)
 Phytoecia erythaca  (Pascoe, 1858)
 Phytoecia fervida (Pascoe, 1871)
 Phytoecia forticornis Breuning, 1946
 Phytoecia holonigra Breuning, 1955
 Phytoecia hovorkai Teocchi & Sudre, 2009
 Phytoecia incallosa (Breuning, 1950)
 Phytoecia incensoides Breuning, 1978
 Phytoecia indica Breuning, 1951
 Phytoecia insignis (Aurivillius, 1914)
 Phytoecia maculicollis (Peringuey, 1888)
 Phytoecia melanocephala (Fabricius, 1787)
 Phytoecia metallescens (Aurivillius, 1923)
 Phytoecia neavei Aurivillius, 1914
 Phytoecia nigrofemorata Breuning, 1946
 Phytoecia nivea Kraatz, 1882
 Phytoecia ochraceipennis Kraatz, 1882
 Phytoecia orientis (Aurivillius, 1908)
 Phytoecia pallidipennis Plavilstshikov, 1926
 Phytoecia povolnyi Heyrovsky, 1971
 Phytoecia pseudolateralis Breuning, 1954
 Phytoecia pseudoruficeps Breuning, 1951
 Phytoecia remaudierei (Villiers, 1967)
 Phytoecia repetkensis Semenov, 1935
 Phytoecia rufa Breuning, 1950
 Phytoecia ruficollis (Aurivillius, 1914)
 Phytoecia seminigripennis Breuning, 1956
 Phytoecia subcoerulea Breuning, 1951
 Phytoecia sublateralis Breuning
 Phytoecia subrufulescens Breuning, 1981
 Phytoecia tatyanae Skrylnik, 2010
 Phytoecia tekensis Semenov, 1896
 Phytoecia vittata (Peringuey, 1888)
 Phytoecia vittipennis Reiche, 1877

subgenus Cardoria
 Phytoecia scutellata (Fabricius, 1793)

subgenus Cinctophytoecia
 Phytoecia albosuturalis Breuning, 1947
 Phytoecia cinctipennis Mannerheim, 1849
 Phytoecia guilleti Pic, 1906
 Phytoecia kukunorensis Breuning, 1943
 Phytoecia punctipennis Breuning, 1947
 Phytoecia sareptana Ganglbauer, 1888
 Phytoecia testaceolimbata Pic, 1933

subgenus Coptosia
 Phytoecia gianassoi (Sama, 2007)

subgenus Epiglenea
 Phytoecia comes (Bates, 1884)

subgenus Fulgophytoecia
 Phytoecia circumdata Kraatz, 1882
 Phytoecia pilosicollis Holzschuh, 1981
 Phytoecia valentinae Skrylnik, 2010

subgenus Helladia
 Phytoecia armeniaca Frivaldsky, 1878
 Phytoecia demelti (Sama, 2003)
 Phytoecia diademata Faldermann, 1837
 Phytoecia ferrugata Ganglbauer, 1884
 Phytoecia flavescens (Brullé, 1833)
 Phytoecia humeralis (Waltl, 1838)
 Phytoecia imperialis (Sama & Rejzek, 2001)
 Phytoecia insignita Chevrolat, 1854
 Phytoecia millefolii (Adams, 1817)
 Phytoecia nigroapicalis Breuning, 1944
 Phytoecia orbicollis Reiche & Saulcy, 1858
 Phytoecia paulusi Holzschuh, 1971
 Phytoecia plasoni Ganglbauer, 1884
 Phytoecia pontica Ganglbauer, 1884
 Phytoecia praetextata (Steven, 1817)
 Phytoecia pretiosa Faldermann, 1837
 Phytoecia testaceovittata (Pic, 1934)

subgenus Kalashania
 Phytoecia erivanica Reitter, 1899
 Phytoecia pici Reitter, 1892
 Phytoecia truncatipennis Pic, 1919

subgenus Metallidia
 Phytoecia alinae Kasatkin, 2011

subgenus Mimocoptosia
 Phytoecia iraniensis Breuning & Villiers, 1972

subgenus Musaria
 Phytoecia affinis (Harrer, 1784)
 Phytoecia anatolica Fuchs & Breuning, 1971
 Phytoecia argus (Frölich, 1793)
 Phytoecia astarte Ganglbauer, 1885
 Phytoecia cephalotes Küster, 1846
 Phytoecia faldermanni Faldermann, 1837
 Phytoecia kurdistana Ganglbauer, 1883
 Phytoecia puncticollis Faldermann, 1837
 Phytoecia rubropunctata (Goeze, 1777) 
 Phytoecia tirellii Luigioni, 1913
 Phytoecia wachanrui Mulsant, 1851

subgenus Neomusaria
 Phytoecia adusta Reitter, 1889
 Phytoecia balcanica (Frivaldsky, 1835)
 Phytoecia dantchenkoi Danilevsky, 2008
 Phytoecia latepubens (Pic, 1926)
 Phytoecia longicornis (Pesarini & Sabbadini, 2009)
 Phytoecia merkli Ganglbauer, 1884
 Phytoecia pauliraputii (Sama, 1993)
 Phytoecia salvicola Holzschuh, 1989
 Phytoecia suvorowi Pic, 1905
 Phytoecia waltli (Sama, 1991)

subgenus Opsilia
 Phytoecia aspericollis Holzschuh, 1981
 Phytoecia badenkoi Danilevsky, 1988
 Phytoecia bucharica Breuning, 1943
 Phytoecia caerulescens (Scopoli, 1763)
 Phytoecia chinensis Breuning, 1943
 Phytoecia irakensis Breuning, 1967
 Phytoecia molybdaena (Dalman, 1817)
 Phytoecia prasina Reitter, 1911
 Phytoecia schurmanni Fuchs, 1971
 Phytoecia transcaspica Fuchs, 1955
 Phytoecia uncinata (W. Redtenbacher, 1842)
 Phytoecia varentzovi Semenov, 1896

subgenus Phytoecia
 Phytoecia acridula Holzschuh, 1981
 Phytoecia aenigmatica Sama, Rapuzzi & Rejzek, 2007
 Phytoecia algerica Desbrochers, 1870
 Phytoecia annulicornis Reiche, 1877
 Phytoecia asiatica Pic, 1892
 Phytoecia bodemeyeri Reitter, 1913
 Phytoecia caerulea (Scopoli, 1772)
 Phytoecia centaureae Sama, Rapuzzi & Rejzek, 2007
 Phytoecia coeruleomicans Breuning, 1946
 Phytoecia croceipes Reiche & Saulcy, 1858
 Phytoecia cylindrica (Linnaeus, 1758)
 Phytoecia erythrocnema Lucas, 1847
 Phytoecia ferrea Ganglbauer, 1887
 Phytoecia flavipes (Fabricius, 1801)
 Phytoecia gaubilii Mulsant, 1851
 Phytoecia geniculata Mulsant, 1862
 Phytoecia gougeleti Fairmaire, 1880
 Phytoecia icterica (Schaller, 1783)
 Phytoecia kabateki Sama, 1996
 Phytoecia malachitica Lucas, 1849
 Phytoecia manicata Reiche & Saulcy, 1858
 Phytoecia marki Plavilstshikov, 2008
 Phytoecia mongolorum Namhaidorzh, 1979
 Phytoecia nausicae Rejzek & Kakiopoulos, 2004
 Phytoecia nepheloides Sama, 1997
 Phytoecia nigricornis (Fabricius, 1781)
 Phytoecia pubescens Pic, 1895
 Phytoecia pustulata (Schrank, 1776)
 Phytoecia rabatensis Sama, 1992
 Phytoecia rufipes (Olivier, 1795)
 Phytoecia rufiventris Gautier des Cottes, 1870
 Phytoecia rufovittipennis Breuning, 1971
 Phytoecia sibirica (Gebler, 1842)
 Phytoecia sikkimensis Pic, 1907
 Phytoecia stenostoloides Breuning, 1943
 Phytoecia subannularis Pic, 1901
 Phytoecia tenuilinea Fairmaire, 1877
 Phytoecia vaulogeri Pic, 1892
 Phytoecia virgula (Charpentier, 1825)
 Phytoecia vulneris Aurivillius, 1923

subgenus Pilemia
 Phytoecia angusterufonotata (Pic, 1952)
 Phytoecia annulata Hampe, 1852
 Phytoecia breverufonotata (Pic, 1952)
 Phytoecia griseomaculata (Pic, 1891)
 Phytoecia halperini Holzschuh, 1999
 Phytoecia hirsutula (Frölich, 1793)
 Phytoecia serriventris Holzschuh, 1984
 Phytoecia smatanai Holzschuh, 2003
 Phytoecia tigrina Mulsant, 1851
 Phytoecia vagecarinata (Pic, 1952)

subgenus Pseudoblepisanis
 Phytoecia analis (Fabricius, 1781)
 Phytoecia atripennis Breuning, 1951
 Phytoecia atrohumeralis Breuning, 1964
 Phytoecia basilevskyi Breuning, 1950
 Phytoecia cylindricollis (Kolbe, 1893)
 Phytoecia fuscolateralis Breuning, 1977
 Phytoecia haroldi (Fahraeus, 1872)
 Phytoecia luteovittigera Pic, 1906
 Phytoecia nigriventris (Kolbe, 1893)
 Phytoecia nigrohumeralis Breuning, 1950
 Phytoecia pseudafricana Breuning, 1951
 Phytoecia pseudosomereni Breuning, 1964
 Phytoecia somereni Breuning, 1951
 Phytoecia sylvatica (Hintz, 1916)

subgenus Pseudomusaria
 Phytoecia farinosa Ganglbauer, 1885

subgenus Pygoptosia
 Phytoecia eugeniae Ganglbauer, 1884
 Phytoecia speciosa Frivaldszky, 1884

subgenus Semiangusta
 Phytoecia delagrangei Pic, 1892
 Phytoecia katarinae Holzschuh, 1974
 Phytoecia rebeccae (Sama & Rejzek, 2002)

References

 
Cerambycidae genera